7IN—83–88 is a collection of 7-inch singles released by R.E.M. The collection covers their singles released on the I.R.S. label between 1983 and 1988.

Reception
The Line of Best Fits Alex Lee Thomson gave the collection a nine out of 10, calling it a "'how to' guide for the craft of songwriting and an uncompromising blueprint for independent artists".

Track listing
All songs written by Bill Berry, Peter Buck, Mike Mills, and Michael Stipe, except where noted
"Radio Free Europe" / "There She Goes Again" (Lou Reed)
"So. Central Rain (I'm Sorry)" / "King of the Road" (Roger Miller)
"(Don't Go Back To) Rockville" / "Catapult" (Live)
"Cant Get There from Here" / "Bandwagon" (Berry, Buck, Mills, Lynda Stipe, and M. Stipe)
"Driver 8" / "Crazy" (Randy Bewley, Vanessa Briscoe, Curtis Crowe, Michael Lachowski)
"Wendell Gee" / "Crazy" (Bewley, Briscoe, Crowe, and Lachowski) + "Ages of You" / "Burning Down"
"Fall On Me" / "Rotary Ten"
"Superman" (Mitchell Bottler and Gary Zekley) / "White Tornado"
"The One I Love" / "Maps and Legends" (Live)
"It's the End of the World as We Know It (And I Feel Fine)" / "Last Date" (Floyd Cramer)
"Finest Worksong" / "Time After Time" (Live)

References

2014 compilation albums
B-side compilation albums
R.E.M. compilation albums
Capitol Records compilation albums
I.R.S. Records compilation albums